Northwest Public Broadcasting is the public radio and public television service of Washington State University.  It is an affiliate of National Public Radio, Public Radio Exchange and American Public Media. It operates 19 radio stations and 13 translators across Washington state, Oregon, and Idaho, and provides coverage to parts of British Columbia. The network broadcasts public radio news, talk, entertainment, classical music, jazz, and folk music. Station programming is separated into two main program streams, "NPR News" and "NPR & Classical Music", with simulcast periods during Morning Edition, All Things Considered, Weekend Edition and Weekend All Things Considered. Since November 2013, Northwest Public Broadcasting also operates a 24-hour jazz station, KJEM 89.9, broadcasting in the Pullman and Moscow area.

NWPB headquarters are in the Murrow College of Communications on the WSU campus, with satellite studios at WSU Tri-Cities' campus in Richland, the University of Idaho campus in Moscow, Idaho and studio offices in Tacoma and Wenatchee.

History 
WSU has a long history in broadcasting, dating to 1908 when it was known as Washington State College.  NWPB's flagship station, KWSU 1250 in Pullman signed on December 10, 1922 as KFAE and became KWSC (for Washington State College) in 1925.  For many years, it served a large portion of the Pacific Northwest.  It became KWSU on March 1, 1969, ten years after Washington State attained university status. Edward R. Murrow began his career at the station, as did Keith Jackson and Barry Serafin.  KWSU was a charter member of NPR, and was one of the 90 stations that carried the inaugural broadcast of All Things Considered in 1971.

Expansion
In 1982, KFAE-FM 89.1 at Richland signed on, bringing public radio to the Tri-Cities for the first time. The next year, WSU activated a series of low-powered translators at Ellensburg, Goldendale/The Dalles, Yakima, Lewiston/Clarkston, Ephrata/Soap Lake, Wenatchee, Cashmere/Dryden, and Chelan/Waterville. In 1984, after budget cuts in Idaho, WSU assumed operation of KUID-FM 91.7 at the University of Idaho and renamed it KRFA-FM; this gave it its first FM service in the Pullman area and resulted in the new outlet assuming many of the classical programs on KWSU.

The launch of KNWR, a full-power transmitter at Ellensburg, in 1992 heralded the beginning of two decades of expansion. KNWY in the Yakima Valley went on air in 1993. In 1994, KNWO in Cottonwood, Idaho, was added; additionally, three new translators were commissioned and KRFA increased its power tenfold. KNWV went on air in Lewiston and Clarkston in 1995. 1997 brought KWWS in Walla Walla, and after a $500,000 donation from the estate of Ephrata rancher Paul Lauzier, KLWS at Moses Lake. Port Angeles—and Victoria, British Columbia—were added with the signing on of KNWP in 1998. KQWS at Omak began broadcasting in January 1999; the next year, a translator of KWSU was added in Pullman, giving the station its first FM presence. A translator at Forks was added in 2006. KSWS at Chehalis was built in 2010.

In several cases, the university acquired or began broadcasting over preexisting public radio stations. On January 6, 1997, Northern Sound Public Radio's KZAZ-FM in Bellingham, was merged into the network as its first station west of the Cascades. The license for KMWS at Mount Vernon was acquired from Skagit Valley College, which moved its KSVR to a new license; the university chose the call letters to honor Murrow, a Skagit County native. 

In 2010, KVTI in Tacoma, owned by Clover Park Technical College, began broadcasting Northwest Public Broadcasting  full-time after budget cuts prompted the closure of its radio broadcasting program. In 2012, the Yakima School District's KYVT began broadcasting NWPB's NPR News programming under an agreement in which the network provided the district's skills center and an HD2 subchannel for its student programming in exchange for studio space and a primary frequency for the news service, which had not been previously available in Yakima.

On November 1, 2013, WSU launched a third station in Pullman: KJEM (89.9 FM), broadcasting jazz music 24 hours a day to the Pullman and Moscow area and named for J. Elroy McCaw. 

In 2018, Northwest Public Radio merged with Northwest Public Television to become Northwest Public Broadcasting. NWPB broadcasts KWSU-TV from Kamiak Butte to serve the eastern Washington and western Idaho covering Pullman to Spokane. KTNW broadcasts from Richland and covers the Tri-cities area. KWSU-Broadcasts on channel 10. KTNW broadcasts on channel 31.

On April 19, 2022, the Sleeping Lady Foundation's KOHO-FM began broadcasting NWPB's Jazz programming based at KJEM under a programming and services agreement, bringing NWPB's Jazz network to Central Washington for the first time.

Stations 
With one exception, NWPB's transmitters are structured into two services: an NPR news/talk service based on KWSU, and a combined NPR and classical music service based on KRFA.

NPR News

NPR and Classical Music

KFAE-FM also broadcast the Washington Talking Book and Braille Library's Evergreen Radio Reading Service to blind and handicapped listeners on its 67kHz subcarrier until the service's closure on August 15, 2014. KFAE-FM was one of three major FM stations in Washington to do so; KPBX-FM in Spokane and KUOW-FM in Seattle were the others. However, this required a special FM radio capable of receiving such broadcasts; it could not be received on a standard FM radio.

Jazz
KJEM (89.9 FM), is NWPB's flagship jazz service. It broadcasts jazz music 24 hours a day to the Pullman and Moscow area and named for J. Elroy McCaw. Unlike the rest of the network, KJEM is largely student-run.  In 2018, NWPB acquired KOHO-FM and began broadcasting NWPB's Jazz programing to the Wenatchee Valley area.

See also 
 KWSU-TV and KTNW, associated television stations in Pullman and Richland

References

External links 
Northwest Public Broadcasting website

 
NPR member networks
Washington State University